A senator for life was an honorary position in the French Third Republic, similar to that of senator for life in other countries. At one time the French Senate was composed of 300 members, of whom 75 were inamovible ("unremovable").

History
Under the law of 24 February 1875 on the organization of the Senate, there were 300 members of whom 225 were elected by the departments and colonies, and 75 were elected by the National Assembly. The 75 were elected by list and by an absolute majority of votes, and were irremovable, like the members of the Chamber of Peers under the Bourbon Restoration and the July Monarchy.

If a senator for life died or resigned, the Senate would elect a replacement within two months.
By the law of 10 December 1884 appointment of immovable senators ceased and the immovable senators gradually disappeared. Émile Deshayes de Marcère, the last surviving sénateur inamovible, died in 1918. Overall there were 116 lifetime senators. The first 75 had been appointed by the National Assembly and the remaining 41 by the Senate itself.

Notable immovable senators included Gaston Audiffret-Pasquier, first president of the Senate; the scientist Marcellin Berthelot, who became minister of public education and then minister of foreign affairs; Monseigneur Dupanloup; Jules Grévy, elected President of the Republic in 1879; Louis Martel, elected President of the Senate in 1879; Elie Le Royer, elected President of the Senate in 1882; Auguste Scheurer-Kestner, the defender of Alfred Dreyfus; the abolitionist Victor Schœlcher and the statesman Henri-Alexandre Wallon.

In 2005, there was questioning about the status of former Presidents of the Republic. According to the constitution of the Fifth Republic, former presidents are de jure members of the Constitutional Council, which poses a problem of possible partiality. Some members of Parliament and commentators suggested that it should be replaced by a life membership in the Senate. This proposal was, however, not enacted.

List of life senators

The senators for life were:

Antoine Adam
Édouard Allou
Gaston Audiffret-Pasquier
Louis d'Aurelle de Paladines
Camille Bachasson de Montalivet
Numa Baragnon
Agénor Bardoux
Ferdinand Barrot
Jules Barthélemy-Saint-Hilaire
Jean Didier Baze
René Bérenger
Alfred Bertauld
Marcellin Berthelot
Jean-Baptiste Billot
Paul Broca
Lucien Brun
Louis Buffet
Marc-Antoine Calmon
Jean-Baptiste Campenon
Joseph de Carayon Latour
Hippolyte Carnot
Auguste Casimir-Perier
Jules Cazot
François de Chabaud-Latour
Bertrand de Chabron
Paul de Chadois
Nicolas Anne Théodule Changarnier
Antoine Chanzy
Joseph de Chareton
Charles Chesnelong
Jean-Jules Clamargeran
Joseph d'Haussonville
Anthime Corbon
Alphonse Cordier
Hyacinthe Corne
Hippolyte de Cornulier-Lucinière
Ernest Courtot de Cissey
Adolphe Crémieux
Ernest Denormandie
Émile Deschanel
Émile Deshayes de Marcère
Henry Didier
Charles Dietz-Monnin
Guillaume-Ferdinand de Douhet
Eugène Duclerc
Jules Armand Dufaure
Jean-Baptiste Dumon
Félix Dupanloup
Henri Dupuy de Lôme
Jean-Joseph Farre
Paul Foubert
Émile Fourcand
Martin Fourichon
Charles Frébault
Louis Gaulthier de Rumilly
Eugène Goüin
Théodore Grandperret
Henri Greffulhe
Henri François Xavier Gresley
Albert Grévy
Léonce Guilhaud de Lavergne
Gustave Humbert
Bernard Jauréguiberry
Benjamin Jaurès
Charles Kolb-Bernard
Sébastien Krantz
Léon Lalanne
Pierre Lanfrey
Roger de Larcy
Jules de Lasteyrie du Saillant
Léon Laurent-Pichat
Édouard René de Laboulaye
Oscar de La Fayette
Victor Lefranc
John Lemoinne
Alphonse Lepetit
Élie Le Royer
Charles Letellier-Valazé
Émile Littré
Hippolyte de Lorgeril
Victor Luro
Jean Macé
Pierre-Joseph Magnin
Léon de Maleville
Guillaume de Maleville
Louis Martel
Louis Raymond de Montaignac de Chauvance
Paul Morin
Jules Pajot
Charles Paul Alexandre de Pasquier de Franclieu
Eugène Pelletan
Alexandre Peyron
Ernest Picard
Ernest Poictevin de La Rochette
Louis Pierre Alexis Pothau
Edmond de Pressensé
Germain Rampont
Charles Renouard
Amable Ricard
Édouard Roger du Nord
Hervé de Saisy de Kérampuil
Edmond Henri Adolphe Schérer
Auguste Scheurer-Kestner
Victor Schœlcher
Jules Simon
Achille Testelin
Antoine Théry
Pierre Tirard
Hippolyte Clérel de Tocqueville
Bernard-Louis Calouin de Tréville
Louis Tribert
Oscar de Vallée
Étienne de Voisins-Lavernière
Henri-Alexandre Wallon
Louis Wolowski
Charles Adolphe Wurtz

References

Sources

Further reading